Alois Albert  (21 June 1880, Bad Königshofen, Lower Franconia - 16 December 1939) was a German politician, representative of the Bavarian People's Party.

See also
List of Bavarian People's Party politicians

References

1880 births
1939 deaths
People from Bad Königshofen
People from the Kingdom of Bavaria
Bavarian People's Party politicians
Members of the Reichstag of the Weimar Republic